Şeytan Murad Pasha (Arabic romanization Murad Pasha al-Shaytan), also known as Kara Murad Pasha, was an Ottoman statesman. After serving stints as beylerbey (provincial governor) of Lahsa, Basra and Shahrizor, he served as governor of Damascus in 1568–1570. He may have been the Murad ibn Abdullah, sanjak-bey (district governor) of Pasin or Kayseri during the reign of Sultan Suleiman the Magnificent, credited by an inscription and the  renovated the Haji Bektash Veli Complex.

Murad Pasha was called Kara (Black) by the near contemporary historian İbrahim Peçevi, Şeytan (Devil) by the Ottoman historian Mehmed Sureyya and was known as "the great benefactor" by the 18th-century Damascene chronicler Ibn Jum'a. The contemporary historian Mustafa Âlî met Murad Pasha in Damascus and noted that he was mad and had become the object of ridicule of the Damascenes for keeping dolls representing certain viziers. 

During his governorship of Damascus he built a mosque, which was also used a convent for the Naqshbandiyya, a Sufi order. It was situated at the square of Damascus where pilgrims assembled before embarking on the Hajj pilgrimage to Mecca. Murad Pasha died in Damascus in 1570 and was buried in a mausoleum building on the mosque's eastern side. The rooms surrounding the courtyard of the mosque were designated for housing the poor. It is called the Murad Pasha Mosque after him.

References

Bibliography

1570 deaths
Ottoman governors of Damascus